Cawthorne is a village and civil parish in the Metropolitan Borough of Barnsley, South Yorkshire, England.  The village was once a centre of the iron and coal mining industry; today it is part of an affluent commuter belt west of Barnsley.  At the 2001 census it had a population of 1,108, increasing to 1,151 at the 2011 Census.

The village pub, the Spencer Arms, is named after the Spencer-Stanhope family, who once owned large swathes of the local area. Their home was Cannon Hall, the park of which borders the village.

Two earlier residences in Cawthorne were Barnby Hall, home of the Barnby family, and Banks Hall, the seat of the Misses Spencer-Stanhope and of a branch of the Greene family.

Cawthorne is frequented by ramblers as many walking routes start from the village.

The Victoria Jubilee Museum, built to commemorate Queen Victoria's Golden Jubilee, was opened in 1889 and contains numerous unusual exhibits including a stuffed cheetah and a two-headed lamb.

All Saints Church overlooks the village, and there is a Methodist church on Darton Road. All Saints contains memorials to the Barnby and Spencer families.

In the heart of the village stands Malt Kiln Row, originally the malt kiln for Cannon Hall.

See also
Listed buildings in Cawthorne

References

 History of Cawthorne, by Charles Tiplady Pratt (1882)

External links

Villages in South Yorkshire
Geography of the Metropolitan Borough of Barnsley
Civil parishes in South Yorkshire